The WPGA Tour of Australasia, formerly known as the ALPG Tour, is a professional golf tour for women which is based in Australia. WPGA stands for Women's Professional Golfers' Association.

The tour was founded as the Ladies Professional Golf Association of Australia (LPGAA) in 1972 by Alan Gillott, who also later on founded The Golfer newspaper, a free publication provided to golfers and golf clubs, Australia-wide. The LPGAA switched to ALPG Tour in 1991. The first events featured twelve competitors, and the early years were a struggle. However the long-term trend was of gradual expansion and by 2004 there were over 150 members.

The season features about a dozen tournaments, usually played over the Australian summer between November and March. The ANZ Ladies Masters and MFS Women's Australian Open have long been the leading events on the tour, with both being co-sanctioned with the more prestigious Ladies European Tour (LET) which helps attract a higher quality field. In 2010 the New Zealand Women's Open became the third tournament to be co-sanctioned by the LET. The ANZ Masters, the Australian Open and the New Zealand Open have prize funds of A$600,000, A$500,000 and A$400,000 respectively, each higher than the prize funds of all 10 remaining events combined. The New South Wales Open and the Royal Canberra Ladies Classic have purses of A$100,000 and A$125,000 respectively, and no other event has a purse of over A$25,000. Since 2012, the Women's Australian Open has also been co-sanctioned by the U.S. LPGA Tour; in its first year as an LPGA Tour event, the prize fund increased to US$1.1 million. The purse increased to US$1.2 million effective in 2013.

Australian Karrie Webb, one of the leading players in global women's golf, has a background on the tour, and continues to play in its two main events each season. However Webb and other leading members of the ALPG spend most of the year competing outside Australia, principally on the LPGA Tour and the Ladies European Tour.

In January 2012, New Zealand's Lydia Ko became the youngest person ever to win a professional golf tour event by winning the ALPG-sanctioned Bing Lee Samsung Women's NSW Open.

In 2021, the ALPG Tour switched to its current name – WPGA Tour of Australasia.

2009 Schedule and results

2010 Schedule and results

2011 Schedule and results

2012 Schedule and results

2013 Schedule and results

2014 Schedule and results

2015 Schedule and results

2016 Schedule and results

2017 Schedule and results

2018 Schedule and results

2019 Schedule and results

2020 Schedule and results

2021 Schedule and results

2022 Schedule and results

2023 Schedule and results

See also
Women's World Golf Rankings

References

External links
Official site

 
Professional golf tours
Women's golf in Australia